HIBARI is a space mission by Japan for a microsatellite that would test a new attitude control (orientation) method to achieve high accuracy pointing for its small telescope, and was launched on 9 November 2021 by an Epsilon launch vehicle as part of the Innovative Satellite Technology Demonstration Program-2 mission. The key technology to be tested on HIBARI is called "Variable Shape Attitude Control" (VSAC), and it is based on reaction torque by rotating its four solar array paddles.

Conceptual design 
HIBARI is a space mission by the Japanese scientists from the Tokyo Institute of Technology to develop high pointing stability and agile maneuvering of a small satellite by using reaction torque of the satellite's structure. This technology, first presented in 2016, is hoped to substitute the use of reaction wheels and control moment gyroscopes (CMG), which arguably have difficulty achieving both agility and stability simultaneously. This capability would be useful for a very fast response to observe in the direction of gravitational waves or other transient astrophysical phenomena.

The spacecraft is a  microsatellite configured in a  cube, where half of it would carry a small ultraviolet telescope to verify the pointing stability (< 10 𝑎𝑟𝑐𝑠𝑒𝑐2) and accuracy of the VSAC system. The orientation high accuracy would be achieved by rotating the arms of its four solar arrays in an orthogonal axis. Solar cells would be mounted on both sides of each of four solar array paddles.

References 

Satellites of Japan
Space telescopes
Ultraviolet telescopes
2021 in Japan
Spacecraft launched in 2021